The Executive Committee of the North Korean Branch Bureau (NKBB) of the Communist Party of Korea (CPK)() was established by a CPK conference on 13 October 1945, and was through the merger with New People's Party of Korea replaced by the 1st Central Committee of the Workers' Party of North Korea on 30 August 1946. It changed its name to the Central Committee of the Communist Party of North Korea sometime between 2–18 May 1946 and became independent of the CPK.

Plenary sessions

Officers

First Secretary

Second Secretary

Department

Members

References

Citations

Bibliography
Books:
 
 
 

Dissertations:
 

Workers' Party of North Korea
1945 in North Korea
1945 establishments in Korea
1946 disestablishments in North Korea